Mark A. MacDonald (born December 18, 1942) is a Vermont educator, farmer, and Democratic Party politician who served several terms in both the Vermont House of Representatives and Vermont Senate.

Biography
Mark Alexander MacDonald was born in Middletown, Connecticut on December 18, 1942.  His father was Donald Gordon MacDonald, a longtime official with the Agency for International Development who directed AID's activities in Vietnam during the peak of the Vietnam War, and his mother was Barbara (McCloskey) MacDonald, a teacher, farmer and member of the Vermont House of Representatives.  MacDonald's family spent summers in Vermont beginning in 1947, and MacDonald became a permanent resident of Vermont in 1974.  He is a longtime resident of Williamstown.

MacDonald was educated in New Jersey and Washington, DC, and graduated from Washington's Woodrow Wilson High School.  In 1966, he graduated from the Borough of Manhattan Community College with an associate degree in liberal arts.  MacDonald served in the United States Army from 1968 to 1970, including eighteen months of Vietnam War service.

In 1972, MacDonald received a Bachelor of Arts degree in Government & International Relations from Clark University; he then attended Norwich University to obtain his certification as a school teacher. In addition to teaching social studies at Randolph Union High School, MacDonald owned and operated a working cattle farm.

MacDonald is a member of several clubs, civic organizations, and advocacy groups, including: Orange Southwest Teachers Association; Vermont Beef Producers Association; Orange County Farm Bureau; American Legion; Vietnam Veterans of America; and Chelsea Fish and Game Club.  From 1984 to 1994, he served on the Williamstown Planning Commission.

In 1983, MacDonald was appointed to the Vermont House of Representatives to fill the vacancy caused by the death of his mother, who was serving her first term.  He was reelected five times, and served from July 1983 to January 1995.  In 1994 he was the Democratic nominee for the Orange County seat in the Vermont Senate, and was defeated by the Republican incumbent, Stephen W. Webster.

In 1996, MacDonald defeated Webster for the Senate seat; he served two terms, January 1997 to January 2001.  In 2000, MacDonald was defeated by Republican William Corrow, a defeat attributed largely to backlash following MacDonald's support for Vermont's Civil Unions law.  In their 2002 rematch, MacDonald defeated Corrow.  He was reelected every two years since, and has served since January 2003.  In four more elections—1998, 2006, 2010, and 2016—MacDonald defeated Webster.

In 2017, MacDonald was elected as the Senate's assistant majority leader.  According to press reports, he agreed to serve in this post with second-term Senator Becca Balint in the majority leader's position as a means of bridging the gap between the Senate's newer, younger members and its "old guard" veterans. In 2021, he was succeeded as Whip by Cheryl Hooker.

As of 2017, MacDonald was chairman of the Legislative Committee on Administrative Rules.  He is also vice chairman of the Senate Finance Committee, and a member of the Natural Resources and Energy, Rules, and Joint Energy Committees.

Family
In 1983, MacDonald was married to Roberta June Pilk.  They are the parents of three children, daughters Janet and Rustie, and son Max (Mark Jr.); they also cared for several foster children.

Electoral history

References

Sources

Internet

Newspapers

Books

1942 births
Living people
Politicians from Middletown, Connecticut
People from Williamstown, Vermont
United States Army personnel of the Vietnam War
Clark University alumni
Schoolteachers from Vermont
Farmers from Vermont
20th-century American politicians
21st-century American politicians
Democratic Party members of the Vermont House of Representatives
Democratic Party Vermont state senators
United States Army soldiers